Bernard J. Friedman (1916 - June 21, 1912)  was an American Jewish architect whose work helped shape Tucson's mid-century modern commercial design.

Friedman's architectural work left a mark on Tucson's mid-century modernism with his bold and expressive designs that encompassed a wide range of commercial, civic, and educational projects. His work not only reflected national and international trends but also adapted to the unique desert climate of southern Arizona.

See also
 Modernism

References

Modernist architects
20th-century American architects
1916 births
2012 deaths
American ecclesiastical architects
Modernist architects from the United States
Fellows of the American Institute of Architects
University of Illinois alumni
Mid-century modern